Algeria Telecommunications Corporation is a state-owned and the main telephone company in Algeria. It is the sole operator of the fixed telephony network and ADSL in the country.

Algérie Télécom is a subsidiary of  after the latter's creation in 2017.

Activities

Network coverage

Optical fiber 

Corporate affairs

Management
 Messaoud Chettih (2000-2002)
 Brahim Ouaret (2002-2004)
 Khireddine Slimane (2004-2006)
 Mouloud Djaziri (2006-2008)
 Moussa Benhamadi (2008-2010)
 Mohamed Dabouz (2010-2012)
 Azouaou Mahmel (2012-2016)
 Mohamed Sbaa (April–November 2016)
 Tayeb Kebbal (2016-2017)
 Adel Khemane (2017-2019) 
 Mohamed Anouar Benabdelouahad (2019-2020) 
 Hocine Helouane (September 2020 - February 2022)
 Adel Bentoumi (since February 2022)

References

External links 

  
 Planspapa Telecom Info
 Telecom Info information

Companies based in Algiers
Telecommunications in Algeria
Telecommunications companies established in 2003
2003 establishments in Algeria